Jura Rahmonov is a jamoat in Tajikistan. It is part of the city of Tursunzoda in Districts of Republican Subordination. The jamoat has a total population of 33,405 (2015). It consists of 21 villages, including Chashma.

References

Populated places in Districts of Republican Subordination
Jamoats of Tajikistan